This list of Florida Gulf Coast University alumni includes current students, former students, and graduates of the Florida Gulf Coast University in Fort Myers, Florida.

Athletics

 Eli Abaev (born 1998): professional basketball player
 Kierstan Bell, WNBA player, Las Vegas Aces
 Richard Bleier (born 1987), Major League Baseball pitcher for the Boston Red Sox and Team Israel
 Don Carman, retired Major League Baseball pitcher for the Philadelphia Phillies
 Ross Chastain, NASCAR driver for Trackhouse Racing Team
 Casey Coleman, drafted by the Chicago Cubs, pitching for the Leones de Yucatán
 Courtney Jolly, former professional monster truck driver
 Derek Lamely, professional golfer on the PGA Tour
 Chris Sale (born 1989), Major League Baseball for the Boston Red Sox

Politicians
 Matt Caldwell, member of the Florida House of Representatives for District 79 since 2011
 Dane Eagle, member of the Florida House of Representatives for District 77 since 2013
 William Snyder, former member of the Florida House of Representatives for District 82 and sheriff of Martin County

References

Florida Gulf Coast University